This is a list of conservation areas in the West Midlands, England. There are a total of 137 conservation areas throughout the West Midlands.

Birmingham

Birmingham has 27 conservation areas. The first conservation areas in Birmingham were designated in 1969. Birmingham City Council have designed 31 conservation areas, of which one, St Peter's Place, have been de-designated in 1976 following the demolition of the church in its centre. The Castle Bromwich Conservation Area was transferred to Solihull following a boundary amendment from 1 April 1988. The former Key Hill and St Paul's Conservation Areas were incorporated into the Jewellery Quarter Conservation Area on 27 September 2000.

Coventry

Coventry has 15 conservation areas. The first conservation areas were designated in 1968.

Dudley
There are 21 conservation areas in Dudley.

Sandwell
There are six conservation areas in Sandwell.

Solihull

There are 20 conservation areas in Solihull.

Walsall
There are 18 conservation areas in Walsall. The first were designated in 1977.

Wolverhampton
There are 30 conservation areas in Wolverhampton, more than any other metropolitan borough in the West Midlands. The first conservation area was designated in 1972.

See also
Article Four Direction
Conservation in the United Kingdom

References

External links
Birmingham.gov.uk: What is a Conservation Area?

 
Conservation areas
West Midlands
West Midlands